David Stratton (born 1939) is an English-Australian film critic and television personality.

David Stratton may also refer to:
David Straton (martyr), 16th century Scottish nobleman
David Michael Stratton or Mike Stratton (1941–2020), American football player 
David Vincent Stratton (1884–1968), American industrial engineer